Dreamchild is the sixth solo album released by the British singer Toyah Willcox, released in 1994 via Cryptic Records.

Background
In 1992, Toyah began preparing a musical which was to be titled Cindy X, and for which several songs were written and recorded. When the project was abandoned, the songs were changed and revamped for inclusion in the album. Dreamchild is the album with the least amount of input from Willcox herself, with the singer contributing lyrics to only one track. The album was predominantly written by acclaimed producer Mike Bennett, whose credits for labels such as BMG, Trojan, Radikal and Creation Records include The Fall, BMX Bandits, Bob Marley, Kim Fowley, King Tubby and Lee "Scratch" Perry. The dance nature of the album also contrasts with the rest of her catalogue, making Willcox appear like more of a guest vocalist than the leading artist on her own album.

In 1997, the album was reissued by Receiver Records as Phoenix, featuring an additional track of the same name taken from the otherwise unreleased Eternity (Madhatter) sessions, and radically different artwork. However, it was missing the complete lyrics included in the original issue. The album was re-issued in the UK by Cherry Red Records in 2010. It added five extra tracks, including the original Cindy X versions of some songs and an outtake from the unreleased Eternity (Madhatter) sessions, yet excluded the song "Phoenix". This edition retains the original title and cover, albeit with Toyah's eyes open, not closed.

Track listings

Original release
 "Now and Then" (Mike Bennett) – 4:41
 "Let Me Go" (Bennett) – 4:56
 "World of Tension" (Bennett) – 4:23
 "Out of the Blue" (Bennett) – 5:51
 "Unkind" (Bennett) – 4:48
 "Dreamchild" (Bennett) – 6:22
 "Lost and Found" (Bennett) – 4:44
 "Over You" (Bennett, Tacye) – 5:18
 "I Don't Know" (Bennett, Toyah Willcox, Paul Mex, Tacye) – 5:16
 "Disappear" (Bennett, Paul Moran, Tayce) – 2:42
 "Tone Poem" (Bennett, Moran) – 7:10
 "Now and Then" (Extended X-Rated Mix) – 7:59

1997 Phoenix release
 "Now and Then" – 4:41
 "Let Me Go" – 4:56
 "World of Tension" – 4:23
 "Out of the Blue" – 5:51
 "Unkind" – 4:48
 "Dreamchild" – 6:22
 "Lost and Found" – 4:44
 "Over You" – 5:18
 "I Don't Know" – 5:16
 "Disappear" – 2:42
 "Phoenix" (Bennett, Tacye, Bob Skeat) – 8:26
 "Tone Poem" – 7:10
 "Now and Then" (Extended X-Rated Mix) – 7:59

2010 expanded release
 "Tone Poem" – 7:10
 "Now and Then" – 4:40
 "Let Me Go" – 4:57
 "World of Tension" – 4:23
 "Out of the Blue" (Radio Mix) – 4:49 
 "Unkind" – 4:48
 "Dreamchild" – 6:22
 "Lost and Found" – 4:44
 "Over You" – 5:18
 "I Don't Know" – 5:17
 "Disappear" – 2:42
 "Open the Skies" (Bennett) – 4:20
 "Another Way" (Bennett) – 4:37 (alternate version of "World of Tension")
 "Over You" – 3:57 (Cindy X Version)
 "Let Me Go" – 4:48 (Cindy X Version)
 "Lost and Found" – 5:08 (Cindy X Version)

Personnel
Toyah Willcox – lead vocals
Paul Moran – keyboards, brass, programming and arrangements, associate producer
Mike Bennett - guitar, loops, additional vocals, producer
Tacye – additional vocals and samples, associate producer
Paul Mex – producer, keyboards and programming on "Over You" and "I Don't Know"
Jay Stapley – guitars on "Unkind" and "Disappear"
Bob Skeat – bass
Martin Keating, Angus Wallace, Warren Bassett – additional programming
Simon Townsend – programming (2010 edition; tracks 13–16)
Keith Airey – guitars (2010 edition; tracks 13–16)
Tony Lowe – guitars, keyboards (2010 edition; tracks 13–16)
Steve Redford – drums (2010 edition; tracks 13–16)
Lacey Bond, Pippa Gillaro – backing vocals on track 15

Production
Martin Keating, Angus Wallace, Warren Bassett, Paul Mex, Simon Stevens – engineers
Sasha Adams – tape operator
Phil Nicholas – digital editing
Simon Davey – mastering
John Hillman, Simon Platz – executive producers
Craig Astley – executive producer (2010 edition; tracks 13–16)
André Jacquemin – producer, mixing (2010 edition; tracks 13–16)

References

External links
 The official Toyah website

1994 albums
1997 albums
Toyah Willcox albums